St. Paul's Church, in High Street, West Wycombe, England, is one of two Anglican churches in the village.

St. Paul's was built by Lady Elizabeth Dashwood, widow of Sir George Henry Dashwood to serve the village of West Wycombe.
The architect was J. W. Hugall of Oxford and it was built in 1875.

Nicholas Pevsner says:

However, the date given on the stained glass windows gives the date, 1875 (also the date given in the Victoria County History,) and the architect as J.W. Hugall. The roof features pitch pine roof trusses.

Near the church door is a large, traditional, font in which babies are baptised. It symbolises the start of the journey of faith.

There are two stained glass windows, one is a gift from the architect and the other was given by Sir Theodore H L Brinckman Bart. Opposite the door is a large crucifix of Christ the King. It came from a church in Italy. The organ is a small, single manual, chamber one and is used regularly.

St. Paul's is shared by the Serbian Orthodox Church, being named St. Nicholas by them. They hold a service each month. The most prominent feature of the church interior is an iconostasis covered with icons.

There is also a statue of the Virgin Mary in the church and the Blessed Sacrament is reserved here. St. Paul's was consecrated by the Bishop of Buckingham on Sunday 13 June 1937.

St. Paul's is known as the 'Winter Church' and St. Lawrence, on West Wycombe Hill as the 'Summer Church.' This was because there was no road up to St. Lawrence until 1928 and no power until the 1970s.

The West Wycombe Revels, a large village fete, used to be held in the grounds around the church each summer.

References 

1875 establishments in England
West Wycombe
High Wycombe
Serbian Orthodox church buildings in the United Kingdom